The Federation of Small Businesses (FSB) is a UK business organisation representing small and medium-sized businesses. It was formed in 1974 as the National Federation of Self Employed (NFSE). The current name for the organisation was adopted in 1991. It is registered with Companies House as The National Federation of Self Employed & Small Businesses Limited (company number 1263540).

FSB is a member-led, not-for-profit and non-party political organisation. FSB is a lobbying organisation representing small firms and the self-employed to UK, national, local and devolved government.  FSB offers its members a range of benefits, such as a 24-hour legal advice line and free business banking.

Structure 
The current National Chair of FSB is Martin McTague who was appointed on 8 March 2022 

In 2017 FSB had 184 branches around the UK and these were grouped into 33 regions. Each branch and region has its own committee. In addition, there is a national committee which includes representatives from each regional committee.

In January 2018, FSB's Board of Directors altered the organisation's volunteer structure by switching from elected Branches and Regions to an unelected, ad-hoc approach to local lobbying and representation.
This necessitated changes to FSB's National Council which consists of up to 12 appointed representatives.

Lobbying 

FSB's past political lobbying activities have led in its own opinion to a number of benefits for small businesses, such as:

 The introduction of, and periodic increases to, an Employment Allowance for small business employers
 Fast introduction and expansion of a range of government support for small businesses and the self-employed affected by the COVID-19 pandemic; including the Coronavirus Job Retention Scheme (‘furlough’); the Self-Employment Income Support Scheme (SEISS); business rates relief and various grants.  
 The reduction or removal of Corporation Tax for small limited companies
 Creation of small business rates relief
 Preventing the wholesale expansion of VAT to smaller businesses under the current threshold

Membership 

FSB is a member-led federation. Membership criteria are as follows:

 Self-Employed or the owner, partner, or director of a business (or businesses) Based in the United Kingdom
 Fewer than 250 employees.
 Agree to the Members' Code of Conduct
 Not barred from membership

The membership was 185,000 in 2006 and >160,000 in 2016. The membership is 200,000+ if  Joint, Associate, Retired, Connect and Business Creation (pre-start-up) affiliates are included.

Small Business Index 

The FSB Small Business Index measures confidence among small firms. The FSB SBI has been quoted by the Bank of England, the BBC, Economia, and EADT.

Current logo 
The current logo for the organisation was adopted in November 2015. The costs of this re-branding was £0.3M and took well over a year to complete including a complete re-branding of the FSB Website.

See also 
British Chambers of Commerce
Confederation of British Industry
TheCityUK
Institute of Directors

References

External links 
 
 Annual Report 2020-21

Business organisations based in the United Kingdom
Organizations established in 1974